Evgenii Eduardovich Bertels, also written as Berthels, (Russian: Евге́ний Эдуа́рдович Берте́льс | Romanization: Evgeniĭ Ėduardovich Bertel's (25 December 1890 in Saint Petersburg – 7 October 1957 in Moscow) was a Soviet-Russian orientalist, Iranologist and Turkologist, born in a family of Russian free professionals of Danish ancestry. Professor of the Leningrad State University, correspondent member of the Academy of Sciences of the USSR (1939), correspondent member of the Iranian Academy of Sciences (1944), Turkmen Academy of Sciences (1951), Arab Academy of Sciences in Damascus (1955). After World War II Bertels lived and worked in Moscow. After a short-lived interest in entomology, Bertels went into legal studies, graduating from the St. Petersburg Imperial University (1914).

But his genuine interest was oriental studies, so he taught himself Persian and Turkish and in 1918 became a student of the Petrograd Conservatory and the Oriental Department of the Petrograd (later Leningrad) State University, where his teachers were Aleksandr A. Romaskevich, Alexander Freiman, Vasily Bartold, and Sergey Oldenburg. Bertels first academic appointment, in 1920, was at the Asiatic Museum (later the Institute of Oriental Studies of USSR Academy of Sciences), where he worked till his death. In 1934, on the occasion of Ferdowsi millennial celebration, held in Tehran, the Soviet Union sent the largest delegation, which included Bertels, he delivered a lecture, in Persian, on Yazdan (i.e. Ahura Mazda, God, or a divine entity) and Ahriman (i.e. Satan, or a demonic entity) in Shahnameh.

Biography

In 1935, he published a study on Ferdowsi, which was translated into Persian by Sirus Izadi. From the late 1930s to the mid-1950s he was the mentor of most Soviet researchers of Persian and Muslim Turkic literature. In 1948, his monograph "Nizami," was awarded the Stalin Prize. In the same year Bertels' edition of Nizami Ganjavi's Eskandar-Nameh, in collaboration with A. A. Alizada, was awarded the Stalin Prize of the Second Class (or State Stalin Prize, 2nd degree).

Bertels was one of the authors of the first edition of Encyclopaedia of Islam (1913–1938), he also wrote many articles, on Islamic literature and culture, in Great Soviet Encyclopedia. His works on Sufism are regarded as classics in the studies of Sufism in Russia, however, one cannot place him alongside Hellmut Ritter, Louis Massignon, or Henry Corbin. Bertels attended Ibn Sina millenary congress, held in Tehran, 21–30 April 1954, on behalf of USSR, this was his last visit to Iran.
 
One of Bertels chief achievements was introducing Persian classics to Russian readers, his selected Russian translation of the works of Nasir Khusraw, Sanai, Attar of Nishapur, Nizami Ganjavi, Saadi Shirazi, among many others. The editor's preface to the first volume of Bertels' Selected Works (Izbrannye trudy) states that Bertels "literally lived by the creations of the luminaries of Persian poetry", and that "Over 150 of his 295 works were related to Persian literature or the Persian language".

Bertels preparation of a new critical edition of Ferdowsi's Shahnameh, must also be mentioned, Bertels edited only the first two volumes, both published after his death (vol. I in 1960, vol. II in 1962), the whole nine-volume edition was completed in 1971 under the editorship of Abdol Hossein Noushin (1906–1972); and it became the standard edition of Shahnameh, prior to Djalal Khaleghi-Motlagh edition (1990–2008).

Berthels' selected works (Izbrannye trudy), that was supposed to be published in six volumes, ended with the fifth volume, all published after his death, as follows: [I] Istoriya persidsko-tadzhikskoĭ literatury, this volume was translated into Persian by Sirus Izadi, in two parts. [II] Nizami i Fuzuli, [III] Sufizm i sifiĭskaya literatura, was also translated into Persian by Sirus Izadi. [IV] Navoi i Dzhami. [V] Istoriya literatury i kultury Irana. Volumes I-IV appeared in 1960–65. Volume V, published 1988. In the English translation of Great Soviet Encyclopedia (1979), is stated that Bertels " was awarded the Order of Lenin, the Order of the Red Banner of Labor, and a medal." Bertels was buried in Novodevichy Cemetery in Moscow.

See also
Campaign on granting Nizami the status of the national poet of Azerbaijan

Notes

References 

 First Part.
 Second Part.
 With an introduction on Berthels' life and works.

:ru:Бертельс, Евгений Эдуардович
 Originally published in 1940.
 The most comprehensive study in English.

External links
Bertels' monograph "Nizami": Бертельс Е.Э. Великий азербайджанский поэт Низами: Эпоха - жизнь - творчество. (1940)
Bertels' selected works, vols. 1-4, are currently available at "Maxima Library".
Some of Bertels' works, published between 1923-1971, are available at "Oriental Studies.ru".

1890 births
1957 deaths
Corresponding Members of the USSR Academy of Sciences
Academic staff of Saint Petersburg State University
Recipients of the Order of Lenin
Recipients of the Order of the Red Banner of Labour
Stalin Prize winners
Ferdowsi
Nizami Ganjavi
Russian orientalists
Shahnameh
Soviet orientalists
Burials at Novodevichy Cemetery